The following radio stations broadcast on AM frequency 1110 kHz: 1110 AM is a U.S. clear-channel frequency as defined by the Federal Communications Commission. KFAB Omaha and WBT Charlotte share Class A status on this frequency.

Argentina
 LS1 De La Ciudad in Buenos Aires

Mexico
 XEPVJ-AM in Puerto Vallarta, Jalisco
 XERED-AM in San Jeronimo Tepetla, Mexico City
 XEWR-AM in Ciudad Juárez, Chihuahua

United States
Stations in bold are clear-channel stations.

References

Lists of radio stations by frequency